Yan Zidong  (born 10 December 1994), also known as Kevin Yan, is a Chinese actor and singer. He is best known for his roles in the dramas Love is More Than a Word (2016), Till Death Tear Us Apart (2017) and Butterfly Lovers (2017).

Early life and education  
Yan was born on 10 December 1994 in Shenyang, Liaoning, China. He enrolled in Xie Jin Film & Television Art College of Shanghai Normal University in 2012, and graduated in 2016.

Career
In 2013, Yang starred in the micro film Return; the film is also his majoring in college graduation work. After graduating from university in 2016, he signed with Century Agency, a brokerage company and officially entered the entertainment industry.

Yan officially debuted as an actor in 2016 with the drama Love Is More Than A Word, playing Gu She. Thereafter, he became known to the audience. In 2017, he started to gain increased attention and popularity with his role as Zhou Yaohua in historical drama Till Death Tear Us Apart, based on the BL novel Love in a Blaze / A Lifetime Love by Nan Zhi. The same year, he played Bujantai in historical drama Rule the World and starred in the wuxia comedy drama Legend of the Little Monk 2, playing a supporting role. He then starred as the male lead in historical drama Butterfly Lovers, and received positive reviews for his portrayal of Liang Shanbo.

On February 24, 2018, Yan himself issued a statement via Sina Weibo saying that he had cancelled the contract with the original brokerage company Century Agency. In 2019, he starred in the romance drama Meet in Gourmet Food, as well as action crime series The World is Not Fraudulent. Yan also starred in the historical drama Psychic Princess, and youth romance film Miss Forever. 

Yan has been cast in the historical dramas Renascence, and Court Lady. He is set to star in modern romance drama Nothing But Thirty playing a guitarist.

Filmography

Film

Television series

Discography

References

1994 births
Living people
Chinese male television actors
21st-century Chinese male actors
Shanghai Normal University alumni
Male actors from Shenyang
Singers from Liaoning